Bing (Brian) Dawe (born 1952) is a New Zealand artist and sculptor. His art typically embraces significant environmental issues.

Biography 

Dawe was born in Glenavy, South Canterbury, New Zealand in 1952. He graduated from the University of Canterbury, School of Fine Arts in 1976. As well as being an acclaimed artist with works on display in galleries throughout New Zealand,  Dawe was also an educator beginning in 1989 at Christchurch Polytechnic (now Ara Institute of Canterbury) as the Programme Co-ordinator of Craft Design. After 28 years of teaching at Ara Institute of Canterbury, Dawe retired in August 2017. Around the same time he completed a 3D cast bronze work for Ara's North Green gateway called Diverting. Defending. Birds over the Waimakiriri.

Awards 

 2013 Friends Acquisition Award, Sculpture in the Gardens, Auckland Botancial Gardens, Auckland, New Zealand.    
 2010 People's Choice Award, Sculpture in the Gardens, Auckland Botanical Gardens, Auckland New Zealand.    
 1999 Paramount Award, Wallace Art Awards, New Zealand    
 1995 Arts Excellence Award, Trust Bank Canterbury, NZ Residencies

New Zealand Public Commissions 

 2018 Piwakawaka fantail over the Liffey (Landscape with too many holes series) commissioned by Lincoln Community Committee and located outside Lincoln Library, Christchurch. 
 2015 Waiting for St Francis - A gateway, bronze and steel (Landscape with too many holes series) commissioned by Tai Tapu Sculpture Garden founders
 2005 From the draining (Eels on hoop) commissioned by Christchurch City Council for Parklands Library
 2001 Out of the black water, kauri and steel, located in the old Christchurch Boys’ High School Building, The Christchurch Arts Centre Te Matatiki Toi Ora commissioned by Scape Public Art

Bibliography 

 Dawe, B., Walter, K. & Emery, J. (2013). Vanishing point: three artists present an evocation of the Mackenzie Basin: Bing Dawe, Keith Walter, John Emery.  
 Attwood, P., Fountain, M. & Massey, C. (2015). Medal artists of New Zealand: regroup, reflect, regenerate; 25th anniversary exhibition.Curated by Marté Szirmay.
 Dawe, B. (1999). Bing Dawe: Acts of Enquiry. Robert McDougall Art Gallery.

References

1952 births
Living people
Artists from Christchurch
New Zealand sculptors
University of Canterbury alumni
People from South Canterbury